McLean Hospital (formerly known as Somerville Asylum and Charlestown Asylum) is a psychiatric hospital in Belmont, Massachusetts. It is noted for its clinical staff expertise and neuroscience research and is also known for the large number of famous people who have been treated there. McLean maintains the world's largest neuroscientific and psychiatric research program in a private hospital. It is the largest psychiatric facility of Harvard Medical School, an affiliate of Massachusetts General Hospital, and part of Mass General Brigham, which also includes Brigham and Women's Hospital.

History 

McLean was founded in 1811 in a section of Charlestown, Massachusetts that is now a part of Somerville, Massachusetts. Originally named Asylum for the Insane, it was the first institution organized by a group of prominent Bostonians who were concerned about homeless mentally ill persons "abounding on the streets and by-ways in and about Boston". The effort was organized by Rev. John Bartlett, chaplain of the Boston Almshouse. The hospital was built around a Charles Bulfinch mansion, which became the hospital's administrative building; most of the other hospital buildings were completed by 1818.

The institution was later given the name The McLean Asylum for the Insane in honor of one of its earliest benefactors, John McLean, who granted enough money to build several such hospitals. A portrait of McLean now hangs in the present Administration Building, along with other paintings that were once displayed in the original hospital. In 1892, the facility was renamed McLean Hospital in recognition of broader views on the treatment of mental illness.

In 1895 the campus moved to Waverley Oaks Hill in Belmont, Massachusetts. Joseph Curtis (civil engineer)  and Frederick Law Olmsted (the renowned landscape architect who also conceptualized the Emerald Necklace public spaces of Boston, New York's Central Park, and Hartford's Institute of Living) were consulted on the selection of the hospital site.  The move was necessitated by changes in Charlestown, including new rail lines and other distracting development. Olmsted himself was eventually treated at McLean, but there is no evidence that he was responsible for the design of the grounds. Once hospital construction began, Curtis was hired by the hospital, and supervised the landscape work for many years.

In the 1990s, facing falling revenue in a changing health care industry, the hospital drafted a plan to sell a portion of its grounds for development in the Town of Belmont. The proposed sale of the land caused a divisive and somewhat baroque political debate in the town during the late 1990s. Ultimately a plan to preserve some of Olmsted's original open space and to allow the town to develop mixed residential and commercial real estate prevailed over a plan to create only high-end residential development. The deal was finalized in 2005, and land development was well underway by the end of the year.  Most of the Belmont campus (more than ) had been listed on the National Register of Historic Places in 2003.

Current work
McLean is known widely for its treatment of adolescents, most specifically its treatment of borderline personality disorder using dialectical behavioral therapy developed by Marsha M. Linehan.

, McLean is led by Scott L. Rauch, President and Psychiatrist in Chief, who is known for his innovative work using brain imaging methods to study psychiatric dysfunction.

As one of the teaching hospitals of Harvard Medical School, McLean is differentiated from its New England peers (such as The Institute of Living and the Brattleboro Retreat) by its combination of teaching, treatment, and research; most other facilities focus on only one of these priorities. It is home to the Harvard Brain Tissue Resource Center, the largest "brain bank" collection of research specimens in the world. The hospital developed and implemented national health screening methods for alcohol, depression, and memory disorders. The Cole Resource Center, a mental health consumer resource and advocacy center, is located at the hospital.

Rankings 

 McLean Hospital is ranked 1st among all psychiatric hospitals in the country according to U.S. News & World Report.
 In 2017, McLean ranked among the top 20 independent hospitals worldwide receiving National Institutes of Health grant support.

Former patients
Mathematician John Nash; musicians James Taylor, and Ray Charles; poets Sylvia Plath, Robert Lowell and Anne Sexton; Massachusetts politician and Civil War general Nathaniel P. Banks; authors Susanna Kaysen and David Foster Wallace; and criminal Michelle Carter have been treated at McLean Hospital.

In books and media
One popular and anecdotal history of McLean is Alex Beam's Gracefully Insane: Life and Death Inside America's Premier Mental Hospital.  More-factual and scholarly accounts of the history are recorded in the Little and Sutton books listed in "Further reading".

Memoirs of time spent within McLean's walls include Sylvia Plath's novel The Bell Jar, and Susanna Kaysen's Girl, Interrupted, which was made into a film of the same name starring Winona Ryder and Angelina Jolie. Samuel Shem's roman à clef Mount Misery tells a story inspired at least in part by the author's experiences at McLean. The 1994 Under Observation: Life Inside A Mental Hospital by Lisa Berger and Alexander Vuckovic uses some fictional techniques (composite characters, etc.) to describe some of the typical events at McLean. James Taylor's song "Knockin' 'Round the Zoo" recalls his stay at McLean as a teenager. Poems of Boston and Just Beyond: From the Back Bay to the Back Ward by Doug Holder are based on his more than three decades working there, and are archived at the poetry room at the Lamont Library at Harvard University.

See also
National Register of Historic Places listings in Middlesex County, Massachusetts

References

Further reading 

 (on his time spent at McLean Hospital)

 (on his time spent at McLean Hospital)

External links 
 McLean Hospital website
 Harvard Brain Tissue Resource Center
  Boston Book Festival/ Oct,2014. Poets in the Asylum Panel: Poets of McLean Hospital. Audio File.  Panelists: Alex Beam, Lois Ames, Kathleen Spivack, Wendy Ranan. Hosted by Doug Holder  Poets of McLean Hospital Panel

 
Psychiatric hospitals in Massachusetts
Hospitals in Middlesex County, Massachusetts
Belmont, Massachusetts
Harvard Medical School
Hospitals established in 1811
1811 establishments in Massachusetts
Hospital buildings completed in 1895
National Register of Historic Places in Cambridge, Massachusetts
Historic districts in Middlesex County, Massachusetts